The bluestripe shiner (Cyprinella callitaenia) is a species of ray-finned fish in the  family Cyprinidae.
It is found only in the United States where it is found in the Apalachicola River drainage in Florida, Alabama, and Georgia.

References

Cyprinella
Taxa named by Reeve Maclaren Bailey
Taxa named by Robert Henry Gibbs
Fish described in 1956
Taxonomy articles created by Polbot